Michele "Shelly" Diane Miscavige (née Barnett; born January 18, 1961) is a member of the Church of Scientology's Sea Org who married Scientology leader David Miscavige, and a notable missing person; she was last seen in public in August 2007.

Since her withdrawal from public appearances, she has been the subject of speculation and inquiries regarding her whereabouts and wellbeing. In 2012, attorneys who said they represented her responded by saying she was merely living a private life devoted to the Church of Scientology. In August 2013, actress Leah Remini, a former Scientologist and vocal critic of the organization, filed a missing person report regarding Miscavige with the Los Angeles Police Department (LAPD). Within a few days of receiving the report, the LAPD stated that they located Miscavige, and further stated that she was not actually missing, so the case was closed. A further communication by an attorney representing the Church of Scientology in 2018 claimed that she continues to be a dedicated Sea Org member and is continuing to live a private life.

Scientology career 
Miscavige is a member of the Sea Org, the organization responsible for the international management of the Church of Scientology and its affiliated entities. From the age of 12, she was a member of the Commodore's Messenger Organization (CMO), the internal Sea Org group responsible for personally servicing Scientology founder L. Ron Hubbard aboard his flagship, MV Apollo, in the 1970s. She was described as "quiet, petite and younger than most of the other Messengers at the time ... and a bit overshadowed by the older girls". Jim Dincalci, one of her shipmates, says that she was "a sweet, innocent thing thrown into chaos".

At the age of 21, in December 1982, she married a fellow CMO member, 22-year-old David Miscavige. She came to view Miscavige as the reincarnation of Simón Bolívar and herself as his mistress Manuela Sáenz.

She subsequently joined her husband's group as the official assistant to her husband, the chairman of the board (COB) of Scientology's Religious Technology Center. According to author Lawrence Wright, she was closely involved in Scientology's liaison with its highest profile member, Tom Cruise. When Cruise began a three-year relationship with Penélope Cruz, Miscavige supervised Cruz's auditing and helped her through Scientology's Purification Rundown program.

After the end of the Cruise–Cruz relationship, Miscavige was reported to have led a Scientology program to find a new girlfriend for Tom Cruise. Around a hundred young Scientologist actresses were interviewed, though they were not told why. An actress named Nazanin Boniadi was introduced to Cruise and dated him for a few months before he broke off the relationship in January 2005. The search resumed, with more actresses invited to audition for what they thought was a role in a forthcoming Mission: Impossible film, and eventually concluded with Katie Holmes meeting and marrying Cruise. His attorney denies that any Scientology executive set him up with girlfriends. Miscavige subsequently oversaw a project to use Scientology members and contractors to renovate Cruise's nine-bedroom mansion in Beverly Hills.

Public disappearance 
In 2006, Shelly returned before her husband from a trip aboard the Freewinds. After David Miscavige arrived back, Shelly was said to have "visibly changed" her mood and to have "looked cowed". Mike Rinder, then Scientology's chief spokesman, says that she asked him if her husband was still wearing his wedding ring. Shortly afterwards, in June 2006, she disappeared and no longer made any appearances in public.

Miscavige has not appeared in public since August 2007 when she was escorted to her father's funeral.

Missing person reports have been filed with the Los Angeles Police Department concerning Miscavige. At least two such reports have been filed; one is reported by Lawrence Wright, though he does not state who submitted it, while another was filed in August 2013 by actress Leah Remini. Detective Gus Villanueva, in response to the missing person report, said: "The LAPD has classified the report as unfounded, indicating that Shelly is not missing." In August 2013, the Los Angeles Police Department confirmed they located and spoke with Miscavige following a missing-persons report filed by Remini. Remini, who used to be a member of the Church of Scientology, questioned her absence at the wedding of Tom Cruise and Katie Holmes. Remini further questioned Shelly Miscavige's whereabouts in her show produced for the A&E network, Leah Remini: Scientology and the Aftermath in December 2018, five years after detectives closed her missing persons case, saying that they had met with her in person. The Church of Scientology responded to the announcement of the episode in a letter: "Remini is a foaming anti-Scientologist. Mrs. Miscavige has personally and repeatedly told law enforcement that Remini's acts are abusive. Remini is unhinged and Remini and her cohorts should be prosecuted for knowingly filing a false missing person's report."

The Church of Scientology has not commented on Miscavige's location. In July 2012, responding to press accounts of speculation on Miscavige's whereabouts, two UK newspapers were informed by lawyers who said they represented Miscavige and "that she is not missing and devotes her time to the work of the Church of Scientology."

Some former members of Sea Org have said that they believe Miscavige is being held against her will at the compound of the Scientologist's Church of Spiritual Technology corporation near the mountain town of Running Springs in San Bernardino County, California.

Scientology's then-spokesman Tommy Davis told Lawrence Wright that he knew where she was, but wouldn't tell him where.

Family and personal life 
Shelly Miscavige's mother, Mary Florence "Flo" Fike Barnett, was a long-time Scientologist who later resigned, taking with her copies of "confidential upper-level materials". She joined David Mayo's Advanced Ability Center, an independent Scientology organization considered heterodox by the Church of Scientology. According to testimony by former high-ranking church executive Vicki Aznaran,“The fact that David Miscavige was linked to [Flo Barnett] by familial ties was extremely repugnant to him and to his wife...”

On September 8, 1985, Flo Barnett was found dead at age 52 from a shot to the head from a Ruger 10/22 rifle. The body also had three rifle shot wounds to the chest (one surface wound, one through a breast implant, and one that passed through the left lung and fractured a rib), and there were superficial slash marks on her wrists that were identified in the autopsy report as possibly having been a few days old. Despite the admittedly "very, very, very unusual" circumstances of multiple gunshot wounds and the unwieldy nature of the weapon, her death was ruled as consistent with suicide. David Miscavige strongly denied any part in his mother-in-law's death in an affidavit on the case, calling it a "personal tragedy in my family’s life." However, in the presence of other witnesses he was reported to exclaim, "That bitch got what she deserved."

Shelly Miscavige's father, Maurice Elliott Barnett, died in August 2007 and Shelly was escorted to the funeral. She has not been seen publicly since.

In popular culture
The Fox police sitcom television series Brooklyn Nine-Nine makes reference to Miscavige's alleged disappearance in its fifth-season episode "NutriBoom". The episode satirizes Scientology as a multi-level marketing company that produces amino acids and amino acid reducers, allegedly to improve their clients' health. Brooklyn Nine-Nine'''s parody of Miscavige, Debbie Stovelman, is found to be alive and well, having faked her own disappearance to allow her to run Nutriboom and escape the consequences of illegal activities.

In the Unbreakable Kimmy Schmidt episode "Sliding Van Doors", the character Gretchen, who rose up in  the ranks of a parody of Scientology named Cosmetology, repeatedly asserts that her husband Shelly is “definitely alive.”

In John Oliver's Last Week Tonight'', he included "Where's Shelly" (in Spanish) in the opening montage of the show for an entire season. In the final episode of season 5, he did a piece that wrapped up his year long secret "advertising campaign" for scientology and demanded that they pay him $650,000–$700,000 for it. In his October 2021 segment on Taiwan, he joked about Miscavige's wife before asking, "Where's Shelly?” March 19, 2023 in his ‘Timeshares’ segment, John Oliver said “Where’s Shelly?”

At the 80th Golden Globe Awards in January 2023, host Jerrod Carmichael joked that since Tom Cruise had returned his three Golden Globe awards the previous year, those trophies could be exchanged "for the safe return of Shelly Miscavige".

See also
Scientology controversies

References

Further reading 
 Scientology's Vanished Queen by Ned Zeman, February 20, 2014, Vanity Fair
 Where is the missing wife of Scientology's ruthless leader? 60 Minutes Australia

1961 births
Living people
American Scientologists
Scientology officials
People from Dallas
Scientology-related controversies
Missing people